Crystal Downs Country Club is a private country club and unincorporated community in Benzie County in the U.S. state of Michigan. The community is located within Lake Township on the shores of Lake Michigan. For statistical purposes, the United States Census Bureau defined the community as a census-designated place for the first time for the 2010 census.

Designed by golf course architects Alister MacKenzie and Perry Maxwell in 1929, the par-70,  course offers views of Lake Michigan and Crystal Lake. The Sleeping Bear Dunes National Lakeshore lies just to its east. Despite being consistently ranked among the top courses in the United States (ranked 10th for 2007–08 by Golf Digest) the only tournament of note it has hosted has been the 1991 U.S. Senior Amateur, due to its location far from population centers and the corresponding lack of sufficient facilities (lodging, transportation, infrastructure) needed to accommodate the crowds attracted by major tournament events. Crystal Downs is currently ranked the #19 course in the world according to Golf.com.

Demographics

References

Event venues established in 1929
Golf clubs and courses in Michigan
Golf clubs and courses designed by Alister MacKenzie
Buildings and structures in Benzie County, Michigan
Traverse City micropolitan area
Unincorporated communities in Benzie County, Michigan
Unincorporated communities in Michigan
Census-designated places in Benzie County, Michigan
Census-designated places in Michigan
Michigan populated places on Lake Michigan